The Southern Michigan League was a Minor League Baseball circuit which operated between 1906 and 1912. It was classified as a Class D league from 1906 to 1910 and as a Class C league from 1911 to 1912. After that, the league was known as the Southern Michigan Association between 1913 and 1915.

The Southern Michigan Association held a Class D status in 1913 and was given Class C recognition in 1914 and 1915. The Association closed up after the 1915 season.

Cities represented/teams
Adrian, Michigan: Adrian Yeggs (1909–11); Adrian Lions (1912); Adrian Champs (1913); Adrian Fencevilles (1914)
Battle Creek, Michigan: Battle Creek Crickets (1906–15) 
Bay City, Michigan: Bay City (1907–10); Bay City Billikens (1911–12); Bay City Beavers (1913–15)
Flint, Michigan: Flint Vehicles (1907–15)
Jackson, Michigan: Jackson Convicts (1906–13); Jackson Chiefs (1914); Jackson Vets (1915)
Kalamazoo, Michigan: Kalamazoo White Sox (1906–08); Kalamazoo Kazoos (1909–10, 1913–14); Kalamazoo Celery Pickers (1911–12)
Lansing, Michigan: Lansing Senators (1907–14)
Mount Clemens, Michigan: Mount Clemens Bathers (1906–07, 1914)
Saginaw, Michigan: Saginaw (1906); Saginaw Wa-was (1908–10); Saginaw Krazy Kats (1911); Saginaw Trailers (1912); Saginaw Ducks (1913–15) 
South Bend, Indiana: South Bend Benders (1914); South Bend Factors (1915)
Tecumseh, Michigan: Tecumseh Indians (1906–08)
Toledo, Ohio: Toledo Mud Hens (1914)

League champions
 1906 – Mount Clemens Bathers
 1907 – Tecumseh
 1908 – Saginaw Wa-was 
 1909 – Saginaw Wa-was 
 1910 – Kalamazoo Kazoos
 1911 – Kalamazoo Celery Pickers
 1912 – Adrian Lions
 1913 – Battle Creek Crickets
 1914 – Saginaw Ducks
 1915 – South Bend Factors

Standings & statistics

1906 to 1910
1906 Southern Michigan League
 Saginaw began play July 18. It was awarded a record of 15-20 when added. The Battle Creek record of 4-38 was expunged on July 21 and the reorganized team was awarded a record of 15-20 on July 22. The official standings were unequal due to the adjusted won-lost records. 
 
1907 Southern Michigan League
 Jackson folded July 15. 

1908 Southern Michigan League - schedule 
 
 
1909 Southern Michigan League
 
 
1910 Southern Michigan League - schedule 
 Playoff: Kalamazoo 4 games, Lansing 2.

1911 to 1912
1911 Southern Michigan Association - schedule 
 

1912 Southern Michigan League - schedule
 Bay City and Saginaw disbanded July 13.

1913 to 1915
1913 Southern Michigan Association
 

1914 Southern Michigan Association - schedule
Lansing (33-35) moved to Mt. Clemens July 10.Playoff: Saginaw 4 games, Bay City 1. 
 

1915 Southern Michigan Association - schedule
The league disbanded July 7.

References
 Encyclopedia of Minor League Baseball, second edition, April 1997.

Defunct minor baseball leagues in the United States
Baseball leagues in Michigan
Sports leagues established in 1906
Sports leagues disestablished in 1915
Baseball leagues in Ohio
Baseball leagues in Indiana